David William Tilden Zearfoss (January 1, 1868 – September 12, 1945) was a professional baseball catcher. He played all or part of five seasons in Major League Baseball between 1896 and 1905 for the New York Giants and the St. Louis Cardinals. He had a .208 batting average for his major league career. He died in 1945 and was buried in Northwood Cemetery in Philadelphia.

Sources

1868 births
1945 deaths
Sportspeople from Schenectady, New York
Major League Baseball catchers
New York Giants (NL) players
St. Louis Cardinals players
New York Metropolitans (minor league) players
Newark Colts players
Minneapolis Millers (baseball) players
Toronto Canucks players
Great Falls Indians players
Tacoma Tigers players
Butte Miners players
San Francisco Seals (baseball) players
San Francisco Pirates players
Kansas City Blues (baseball) players
Toledo Mud Hens players
Topeka White Sox players
Franklin Millionaires players
Washington College Shoremen baseball players
Baseball players from New York (state)
19th-century baseball players
Burials at Northwood Cemetery, Philadelphia